Chōgattai Majutsu Robo Ginguiser is a Japanese mecha anime television series produced by Nippon Animation. It ran from April 9 to October 22, 1977.

Episode list

Chōgattai